Narp (also Romanized as Nārp; also known as Nārb and Qal‘eh Nārp) is a village in Mashiz Rural District, in the Central District of Bardsir County, Kerman Province, Iran. At the 2006 census, its population was 653, in 138 families.

References 

Populated places in Bardsir County